Bremer Ehrler (July 10, 1914 – February 9, 2013) was an American politician who served as Jefferson County Judge/Executive and secretary of state of Kentucky.

Early life and education 
Ehrler was born in Louisville, Kentucky. As a child, he worked on his family's dairy farm. He graduated from DuPont Manual High School in 1931.

Career 
Ehrler joined the United States Army in 1942 and served until 1968, retiring as a lieutenant colonel. Ehrler worked for the United States Postal Service for 37 years.

Ehrler served as postmaster of Louisville, Kentucky in the 1960s, and was elected to a term as Kentucky secretary of state (1988–1992). He later served as appointed Jefferson County sheriff in 1993.

Ehrler was appointed Jefferson County Judge/Executive by Governor Martha Layne Collins on December 21, 1984, to fill the vacancy left by Mitch McConnell after McConnell's election to the United States Senate. Ehrler served in that post until January 6, 1986. He did not seek election to a second term, opting instead to run for secretary of state in 1987, the year after he left office.

References

1914 births
2013 deaths
Politicians from Louisville, Kentucky
DuPont Manual High School alumni
Secretaries of State of Kentucky
Kentucky sheriffs
Kentucky Democrats
Kentucky postmasters
County judges in Kentucky